Gheorghe Lecca (10 April 1831–30 August 1885) was a Moldavian-born Romanian politician.

Born in Bacău, he was the son of paharnic (royal cup-bearer) Gheorghe Lecca (reportedly a descendant of Leca of Cătun), who died the year after the son was born; and of Maria Negură. Together with his brothers Ioan and Dimitrie, he attended the Cavalry School at Saumur. After returning home in 1854, he took part in the Crimean War. After leaving army service, he served as prefect of Bacău County in 1866, and then as deputy and senator. In early 1882, he was named Finance Minister in the Liberal government of Ion C. Brătianu, serving until his death (in Bacău).

He had four children with his first wife Mariana Mălinescu (d. 1875), and a son with his second, Clara Negură (his first cousin, 1852–1909).  Two of his sons, Caton (1860–1913) and Jean (1863–1898), entered politics.

Notes

1831 births
1885 deaths
People from Bacău
Romanian nobility
Romanian Ministers of Finance
National Liberal Party (Romania) politicians
Members of the Senate of Romania
Members of the Chamber of Deputies (Romania)
Prefects of Romania
Romanian people of the Crimean War